Rudy's Can't Fail Cafe is a diner in northern California named after the Clash song, "Rudie Can't Fail". Rudy's is part-owned by Mike Dirnt from Green Day, and was featured on the Food Network show, Diners, Drive-Ins and Dives.

History
Rudy's Can't Fail Cafe opened in 2002 in Emeryville, CA with a second location in Uptown Oakland near the Fox Oakland Theatre since 2011. The original location in Emeryville was originally Eugene's Ranch which was open for 36 years under Eugene Lee and was still serving its $1.95 2 egg breakfast in 1990.  Eugene's daughter Priscilla approached Jeffery Bischoff, a customer, to see if he would like to purchase the restaurant.  Thirteen years later, Rudy's is an institution in Emeryville and a well known Bay Area diner.

In 2010, Rudy's original location was featured on an episode of Food Network's Diners, Drive-Ins, and Dives.

Rudy's closed their Oakland location on Thursday, July 26th 2018. 

Rudy's BLAT sandwich (a BLT with avocado) was featured on Lonely Planet's A field guide to 20 great American sandwiches.

On August 8th 2022 Rudy's Can't Fail Cafe announced their permanent closure. In October 2022, they re-opened for business under mostly new ownership.

Awards
2004 KPIX Channel 5 Evening Magazine - Best Diner in the East Bay
2004 East Bay Express Best of the East Bay - Best French Fries
2005 Best of Citysearch/ Oakland - Best Breakfast, Best Hamburger
2006 Best of Citysearch/Oakland - Best Breakfast, Best Hamburger
2007 Best of Citysearch/ Oakland - Best Family Friendly Dining
2008 East Bay Express Best of the East Bay - Best Waiter/Waitress Outfits
2008 East Bay Express Best of the East Bay - Winner - Best Diner
2009 Best of Citysearch/Oakland - Winner - Best Breakfast, Best Brunch
2009 SF Gate-SF Chronicle Winner - Best Diner in San Francisco Bay Area
2010 SF Gate-SF Chronicle Winner - Best Diner in San Francisco Bay Area

References

External links
Rudy's Can't Fail Cafe website

Restaurants established in 2002
Restaurants in California
Culture of Oakland, California
Emeryville, California
Food and drink in the San Francisco Bay Area
2002 establishments in California